Amphidromus laevus is a species of air-breathing land snail, a terrestrial pulmonate gastropod mollusk in the family Camaenidae.

References

External links 

laevus
Gastropods described in 1774
Taxa named by Otto Friedrich Müller